The Way I Feel is an album by jazz saxophonist Sonny Rollins, released on the Milestone label in 1976, featuring performances by Rollins with Patrice Rushen, Lee Ritenour, Billy Cobham, and Bill Summers with a brass section added on five tracks.

Reception

The Allmusic review by Scott Yanow calls the album "One of Sonny Rollins' lesser sets of the 1970s".

Track listing
All compositions by Sonny Rollins except as indicated
 "Island Lady" - 5:51
 "Asfrantation Woogie" - 3:14
 "Love Reborn" (George Duke, Flora Purim) - 5:13
 "Happy Feel" - 3:53
 "Shout It Out" (Patrice Rushen) - 5:45
 "The Way I Feel About You" (Duke) - 5:34
 "Charm Baby" - 7:25 
Recorded at Fantasy Studios, Berkeley, California, August–October, 1976

Personnel
Sonny Rollins - tenor saxophone
Patrice Rushen - piano, electric piano, clavinet, synthesizer
Lee Ritenour - guitar
Billy Cobham - drums
Bill Summers - conga, percussion
Oscar Brashear, Gene Coe, Chuck Findley - trumpet (tracks 1-2 & 4-6)
George Bohanon, Lew McCreary - trombone (tracks 1-2 & 4-6)
Alan Robinson, Marilyn Robinson - French horn (tracks 1-2 & 4-6)
Don Waldrop - tuba (tracks 1-2 & 4-6)
Bill Green - piccolo, flute, soprano saxophone (tracks 1-2 & 4-6)
Alex Blake - bass (tracks 3, 6 & 7)
Charles Meeks - electric bass (tracks 1-2 & 4-5)

References

1976 albums
Milestone Records albums
Sonny Rollins albums
Albums produced by Orrin Keepnews
Albums recorded at Total Experience Recording Studios